First Family 4 Life is the third studio album by American hip hop duo M.O.P. from Brownsville, New York. It was released on August 11, 1998 via Relativity Records. DJ Premier produced five songs on the album and also serves as an executive producer of the project (with Laze E Laze). The LP features more guest-appearances than previous M.O.P. projects; cameos include Jay-Z, Freddie Foxxx, Gang Starr, O.C., Heather B., Teflon, and Treach from Naughty By Nature.

Track listing

Charts

References

External links
 

1998 albums
M.O.P. albums
Albums produced by DJ Premier
Albums produced by Da Beatminerz